Portia Solomon Gabor (born April 27) is a Ghanaian journalist, news anchor, and a voice actor who currently works with TV3.

She was adjudged the Journalist of the Year at the 26th Ghana Journalists Awards organized by the Ghana Journalists Awards.

Early life 
She was born to Mrs Audrey Arde-Acquah and Mr Seth Solomon, and raised in Accra, Ghana. She had her nursery education at Aglow Children's Centre in Madina, continued at University of Ghana Basic Schools Legon.

She attended Krobo Girls Senior High School and continued to study psychology at the University of Ghana but began with a Diploma in Communication from AUCC.

She has a Masters in Development Communication from the Ghana Institute of Journalism.

Career 
Portia joined TV3 Ghana after her university education in September 2002 and still works with the brand.

At the Kanda-based television station, Portia is the editor for features and documentaries.

Awards and recognition 
 MTN Heroes of Change 2022
 Journalist of the Year, Ghana Journalist Awards 2022
 Ghana Journalist Awards 2020, Special Award for COVID-19 reporting
 Ghana Journalist Awards 2020, Science reporting.
 Merck More Than a Mother award 2019 for report on Infertility
 Ghana Journalist Awards 2019, she won two awards thus Female Journalist of the Year and Best Report Road safety and Transport. At the night, she together with two other journalists were honored for their contributions to journalism
 Ghana Journalist Awards,  (2019)
 Ghana Journalist Awards Best Environment Reporter (2018)
 Ghana Journalist Awards (2010), (2017) Best TV News Report
 Ghana Journalist Awards (2017) Komla Dumor Most Promising Young Journalist
 Ghana Journalist awards, 2010, News reporting. She received the Best News Reporter and Promising Young Journalist at the Ghana Journalist Awards in 2017.
 Ghana Journalist Awards (2010), Best Report on Development Journalism for Furthering the MDGs. She won best health reporter for TV for a story titled 'Wealth for Health,' as well as best news reporter (TV) for her story titled 'A Beggar's Paradise.'
 CNN Multichoice Africa Journalist Awards 2011. She was nominated for CNN Multichoice Africa Journalist Award in 2011. Her entry ‘Drug trafficking in rural Africa’ was named Highly Commended at the awards.
 Finalist, Highly Commended for story on Drug Peddling in Rural Africa

References 

Living people
Ghanaian television journalists
Ghanaian women journalists
Year of birth missing (living people)